Jack Skinner may refer to:

 Jack Skinner (New Zealand footballer) (1915–2002), football (soccer) player who represented New Zealand
 Jack Skinner (Australian footballer) (born 1917), former Australian rules footballer